The Midnight Special is a 1962 album by Jamaican-American singer, Harry Belafonte. The album notably contains the first officially-released recording by Bob Dylan, who plays harmonica on the title track. For many years the Belafonte session was thought to have been Bob Dylan’s first professional recording, simply because this RCA Victor album was released first. However, documentation found in 2001 in the RCA vaults along with the tapes dates the session definitively as having been recorded at Webster Hall, New York City, in February 1962. This places it later than Bob's recording session with folksinger Carolyn Hester, which dates from September 1961, also in New York City, although her album was not released until later in 1962.

Track listing

Critical reception 
Pig River Records praised "The Midnight Special" on its 50th anniversary giving it 8.1/10.

Personnel
Harry Belafonte – vocals
Ernie Calabria – guitar
Millard Thomas – guitar
Norman Keenan – bass
Percy Brice – drums
Danny Barrajanos – drums
Don Lamond – drums
Joe Wilder – trumpet solo
Jerome Richardson – saxophone
Bob Dylan – harmonica on track 1
Production notes:
Hugo Montenegro – producer
Conducted and arranged by Jimmy Jones
Bob Simpson – engineer, mastering
Peter Perri – cover photo
Bob Bollard – liner notes

References

1962 albums
Harry Belafonte albums
RCA Victor albums
Albums produced by Hugo Montenegro
Albums conducted by Jimmy Jones (pianist)
Albums arranged by Jimmy Jones (pianist)